"Shimmer" is a song by American alternative rock group Fuel. It was released in March 1998 as lead single from their debut album Sunburn.

Written by Carl Bell, the single peaked at number two on the Billboard Modern Rock Tracks charts, number 11 on the Mainstream Rock Tracks chart, number 37 on the Adult Top 40 chart and at number 42 on the Billboard Hot 100.

Content

Guitarist Carl Bell told a crowd on VH1 Storytellers that the song was inspired by an ex-girlfriend he had shortly after high school, who left him for another man she ended up marrying. A few years later, she called Bell, confiding her relationship woes in him, and he felt a range of emotions from hurting to helplessness that inspired the lyrics of "Shimmer".

Critical reception
Dan Snierson of Entertainment Weekly cited "Shimmer" as one of the "mellowest cuts" from its parent album, commenting that the song is a "Dave Matthews-ish ditty". Billboard wrote that "the best thing about 'Shimmer' is that it doesn't wallow in angst melodrama or reek of kiddie-pop sugar," and called it "vibrant, aggressive rock' n'roll for adults."

Music video 
The music video has the band performing the song (mostly centered on singer Brett Scallions) and has short flashes to things like a mother and infant child and a dog. Directed by Josh Taft, the film clip's theme of the past and the present draws quite heavily from the song's lyrics of a shimmering love that while starting off mesmerizing can and will eventually fade and be torn away through emotional distance and neglect. The visions concentrate on the position of a past potential family in the storyteller's life as wholesome visions of a woman post-pregnancy in a white dress, a faceless father holding a baby, a goldfish and a family dog come into focus but are rarely seen clearly as the camera blurs and we are drawn quickly away. As the lyrics grind on describing the prior engagements with the female antagonist Taft brings us quite suddenly to the realization that the goldfish is dead, the family dog blurs away and the baby ceases to move and recedes to a cold blackened shape. The arrival of a female antagonist with symbolic sands of time falling through her outstretched hands heralds the arrival of new life as the song reaches its climax. The protagonist's car ride slowly but surely drifts him along and possibly away from the dead home-life but the goldfish now risen is rejoined by a now clearer vision of the family dog and the squirming life of the baby in a man's arms returns. The director has hinted at an emotionally empty space; a dead home through his lack of furnishings, drained color and detached objectivity but seems to suggest that the storyteller singer becomes the one framed in the past while the others live on as suggested in the closing scene.

Use in media
The song was used in Charmed season one, episode 14 "Secrets and Guys".

Track listings and formats

US CD Single
"Shimmer"  – 3:34
"Walk the Sky"  – 3:19
"Sunday Girl"  – 3:41

EU Maxi
"Shimmer"  – 3:34
"Shimmer" (Acoustic Version) – 3:19
"Walk the Sky"  – 3:19
"Sunday Girl"  – 3:41

AUS CD Single
"Shimmer"  – 3:34
"Shimmer" (Acoustic Version) – 3:19
"Sunday Girl"  – 3:41
"Walk the Sky"  – 3:19

US 7" Vinyl
"Shimmer"  – 3:34
"Sunday Girl"  – 3:41

Credits and personnel
Brett Scallions – lead vocals, guitar
Carl Bell – guitar, vocals
Jeff Abercrombie – bass guitar
Kevin Miller – drums
Steven Haigler – engineer, producer
Tom Lord-Alge – mixing
Jonathan Mover – drums, percussion
Jane Scarpantoni – cello

Credits and personnel adapted from Shimmer CD single liner notes.

Charts

References

Fuel (band) songs
1998 debut singles
Songs written by Carl Bell (musician)
1998 songs
Epic Records singles
Songs about heartache